Eric Veiga (born 18 February 1997) is a Luxembourgish professional footballer who plays as a midfielder for Vilafranquense.

Club career
In 2015, Veiga joined the under-19 side of German club Eintracht Braunschweig from the youth of Bayer 04 Leverkusen. On 3 March 2016, he made his debut for Eintracht Braunschweig II in the Regionalliga Nord.

In July 2019, Veiga moved to Portuguese club C.D. Aves, starting for the club's U23-squad.

International career
Veiga represented both Luxembourg and Portugal at youth level. On 18 May 2016, he was called up to the Luxembourg senior national team by Luc Holtz for a match against Nigeria, but did not play. Veiga made his debut for Luxembourg on 2 September 2016 in a friendly against Latvia.

References

External links 
 
 
 
 Profile  at the website of the Portuguese Football Federation

1997 births
Living people
Sportspeople from Luxembourg City
Luxembourgian footballers
Luxembourg international footballers
Luxembourg youth international footballers
Portuguese footballers
Portugal youth international footballers
Luxembourgian people of Portuguese descent
Association football midfielders
C.D. Aves players
Eintracht Braunschweig II players
U.D. Vilafranquense players
Primeira Liga players
Regionalliga players
Liga Portugal 2 players
Luxembourgian expatriate footballers
Portuguese expatriate footballers
Luxembourgian expatriate sportspeople in Germany
Portuguese expatriate sportspeople in Germany
Expatriate footballers in Germany